Tangir (Urdu:تنگیر) serves as the administrative capital of the Tangir District in Gilgit-Baltistan, Pakistan. In 2019, when Darel was made a district, Tangir was made its capital.

References 

Populated places in Gilgit-Baltistan